The Band of the Irish Guards is one of five bands in the Foot Guards Regiments in the Household Division whose main role is to guard the British monarch. The Band supports the Regiment by providing the musical backing to which much of the ceremonial duties depend within Central London.

Unlike the 1st Battalion, Irish Guards, which moves to various duty stations around the world, the Band is based permanently at Wellington Barracks in St James's, London.

History

The Irish Guards was formed on 1 April 1900 to commemorate the bravery of the many Irish regiments which fought in the South African campaigns. Under the direction of its first Bandmaster, Warrant Officer Charles Hassell, the Regimental Band made its first public appearance the following year. The Band quickly gained a reputation for excellence as evidenced by the glowing press reports in 1905 for what turned out to be the first of many tours of Canada. The citizens of Toronto were so impressed with its performance that they presented the Band with an ornate silver cup, which remains one of its cherished possessions to this day.

On 23 January 1923, the Band made what is believed to be the very first broadcast by a military band, the programme being broadcast live on the 2LO station from a studio in Marconi House in The Strand.

In the 1950s the Band was chosen to give the UK premier performance of Paul Hindemith's 'Symphony for Concert Band'. In 1948, the Band travelled to Palestine to support the Guards battalions involved in the troubles. Sadly, during this time the Band was ambushed and one member, Lance Corporal Ted Jones, was shot and killed. He is buried in Sarafand Military Cemetery.

The Band has also made numerous appearances on television and in films, including The Ipcress File, and Oh! What a Lovely War, as well as being engaged to whistle 'Colonel Bogey' for the soundtrack of The Bridge on the River Kwai. A number of former Band members have continued their musical careers with national orchestras, including the Hallé, the BBC Symphony and the Royal Opera House, Covent Garden.

Two former Directors of Music, Major George Willcocks and Lieutenant Colonel 'Jiggs' Jaeger, also conducted the Black Dyke Mills Band at the National Brass Band Championships.

Over the years the Band has toured extensively, including a visit to Japan in 1972, where it was accorded the honour of being the first foreign band ever to play in the Imperial Palace in the presence of the Empress and the two Crown Princesses.

Key personnel

Director of Music: Captain Neil Skipper
Bandmaster:  CSgt (Bandmaster) Dean Nixon
Band Sergeant Major: WO2 (Band Sergeant Major) Phil Scott

Pipe majors
Original title of "Sergeant Piper" was changed to "Pipe Major" via Army Order 139 of 1928, change to date from 31 July 1928. On St. Patrick's Day 1991, the Queen Mother presented the regiment with its first-ever pipe banner. This is carried by the pipe major on the bass drone of his pipes when a member of the Royal Family is present. In 2013, Pipe Major David Rogers became the first Irish Guards piper to be appointed "Personal Piper to Her Majesty the Queen."

Ensembles

There are several ensembles within the Band of the Irish Guards:
 Concert band
 Marching band
 Dance band
 Fanfare Team
 Orchestra
 "Shillelagh"—Irish folk music band

Events
The Band of the Irish Guards plays regularly at various events; it can be found in London performing at the following occasions:

 Changing of the Guard
 Trooping the Colour
 Beating the Retreat

The Band represented the Household Division in the Royal Edinburgh Military Tattoo several times.

See also
 Coldstream Guards Band
 Grenadier Guards Band
 Scots Guards Band
 Welsh Guards Band
 Household Division

References

External links
 Irish Guards Band - British Army
 Irish Guards Band
 Irish Guards Band

British ceremonial units
Royal Corps of Army Music
Irish Guards
Musical groups established in 1900